List of Orthodox Archbishops of Nikortsminda of the Georgian Orthodox and Apostolic Church:

 Elise (Jokhadze) (present)

References

Georgian Orthodox Church
Nikortsminda